The First East Asia Summit was held in Kuala Lumpur, Malaysia on December 14, 2005. The East Asia Summit (EAS) is a pan-Asia forum held annually by the leaders of 16 countries in the East Asian region. EAS meetings are held after annual ASEAN leaders' meetings.

Attending delegations
The 16 countries and 1 observer involved were:

 observer

Issues relating to the first EAS

The presence of non-East Asian countries 
While India is included in Asia it is normally identified as part of South Asia not East Asia. Australia and New Zealand are usually included in Oceania rather than Asia, although some differ and the distinction can be unclear, and they may be seen as part of the Asia Pacific.

The involvement of countries not seen as traditionally part of East Asia, especially Australia and New Zealand but to a lesser extent India as well, was seen as controversial by some.  The inclusion of Australia and New Zealand was considered problematic as these nations were said to be neither geographically nor culturally part of Asia. Former Malaysian Prime Minister Mahathir bin Mohamad, credited with raising the idea of an East Asian caucus, was especially critical of the involvement of Australia and New Zealand.

Australia's presence was only confirmed after Australia reversed its previous policy and agreed to accede to ASEAN's Treaty of Amity and Cooperation in Southeast Asia.

The presence of India was met by "quiet resistance" from China. This stance may have reflected, in part, the perception that the presence of India would act to lessen Chinese influence in the EAS, as discussed further below.

Although not strictly East Asian all three countries did have a notable history with ASEAN.  In 1974 Australia became ASEAN's first dialogue partner .  New Zealand became a dialogue partner in the following year, 1975 .  Summits with ASEAN for both countries were first held in 1977.

It has been suggested that the final membership of the EAS represents an "anti-region", supplied in order to prevent the emergence of a regional community in Asian East Asia, rather than a region.

Australia and New Zealand as the two Closer Economic Relations (CER) countries have also developed close ties with ASEAN  and have been negotiating a CER-ASEAN free trade agreement since 2004 .

The linkages between ASEAN and India are more recent .  India did not become a full ASEAN dialogue partner until 1995.  Nevertheless, India's "look East" policy has placed particular emphasis on building relationships in the Asian region .

Koizumi's visits to the Yasukuni Shrine 
Japan–China and Japan–South Korea ties were strained ahead of the first Summit because of Japanese Prime Minister Junichiro Koizumi controversial visits to the Yasukuni shrine, which honors 14 war criminals alongside Japan's other fallen soldiers.  These visits are perceived by China and South Korea as symptomatic of a Japan that has not come to terms with its role in World War II, a conclusion disputed by Japan.

The most recent (at the time) visit by Prime Minister Koizumi was on 17 October 2005, so the issue was still fresh by the EAS in December.  As a result, the traditional Japan–China–South Korea meeting on the sidelines of the ASEAN Plus Three meeting (which preceded the EAS) was cancelled by China and South Korea.

The rise of China and the need to check Chinese influence 
The presence of the non-East Asian India, and to a lesser extent Australia and New Zealand, was seen by some as an attempt by some members of ASEAN (such as Singapore, Indonesia and the Philippines) to include countries who by their size or economies may act as a check to the rising influence of China, especially as the weakness in Sino-Japanese relations undermined the ability of Japan to perform that role.

China has attributed the presence of Australia and India to Japanese influence.

The absence of the United States of America 
The absence of the United States of America was seen by some commentators as symptomatic of what was said to be the USA's declining influence in Asia. 

Some view this as linked with what is perceived as Chinese influence rising.

Outcome of the first EAS 
The difficulties in the relationship between the "Plus Three" members (i.e. Japan, China and South Korea) of ASEAN Plus three together with the positioning of parties due to the presence of the non-East Asian countries, India, Australia and New Zealand, resulted in limitations in what could be achieved at the inaugural EAS.  The role of the inaugural EAS then became a confidence building and familiarisation exercise.

The Kuala Lumpur declaration  and the Avian Influenza Prevention, Control and Response  declaration were signed by the 16 leaders during the first EAS.

It was agreed to hold future EASs in conjunction with the annual ASEAN meetings.

The outcomes that were achieved are summarised in the Chairman’s Statement of the First East Asia Summit .

Second EAS 
The Second East Asia Summit was scheduled for the Philippines.

References 

2005 conferences
2005 in international relations
21st-century diplomatic conferences (Asia-Pacific)
ASEAN meetings
Diplomatic conferences in Malaysia
2005 in Malaysia
2000s in Kuala Lumpur
December 2005 events in Asia